, also called Osaka Expo '70 Stadium, is an athletics stadium located in the Expo Commemoration Park, the site of Expo '70, in the city of Suita, Osaka Prefecture, Japan. It has a capacity of around about 21,000.

The stadium was the home ground of J.League club Gamba Osaka between 1993 and 2015 before the club moved to Suita City Football Stadium. It remains in use as a local athletics venue, rugby and as a home venue for Gamba Osaka's Under-23 team in the J3 League.

Access
Approx. one-minute walk from Koen-higashiguchi Station on the Osaka Monorail Saito Line.

External links

 Stadium images

Expo '70
Suita
Sports venues in Osaka Prefecture
Football venues in Japan
Gamba Osaka
Athletics (track and field) venues in Japan
Sports venues completed in 1972
1972 establishments in Japan